Heliconia latispatha (expanded lobsterclaw) is a plant species native to southern Mexico (Tabasco, Oaxaca, Chiapas, Campeche), Central America and northern South America (Colombia, Venezuela, Ecuador and Peru) and naturalized in Florida and Jamaica. It is an herbaceous perennial up to 4 m tall, with leaves resembling those of bananas. The inflorescence is erect, up to 45 cm long, with red or orange bracts subtending green, yellow or orange flowers.

References

External links

 Heliconia latispatha observations on iNaturalist

latispatha
Garden plants
Plants described in 1846
Flora of Florida
Flora of Mexico
Flora of Central America
Flora of Colombia
Flora of Venezuela
Flora of Peru
Flora of Ecuador
Flora of Jamaica
Flora of Tabasco
Flora of Oaxaca
Flora of Chiapas
Flora of Campeche
Flora without expected TNC conservation status